= Jordi Benet =

Andorran football player

Personal information
- Date of birth: 15 July 1980 (age 46)
- Place of birth: Andorra
- Position: Midfielder

Team information
- Current team: FC Andorra

Senior career*
Years	Team	Apps	(Gls)
2000–	FC Andorra		

International career
1999–2001	Andorra	2	(0)
- * Club domestic league appearances and goals

Jordi Benet (born 15 July 1980) is an Andorran football player. He has played twice for the Andorra national team.

== National team statistics ==
Andorra national team
Year	Apps	Goals
1999	1	0
2000	0	0
2001	1	0
Total	2	0
